Anna Calvi is the debut album of British singer-songwriter Anna Calvi, released on 14 January 2011, by Domino Records. In Autumn, 2010, Calvi entered Black Box studio in France with producer Rob Ellis and, using vintage analogue equipment, created "a velvet Wall of Sound that justified the hype in the buildup to its 2011 release." The album peaked at No. 40 in the UK Album Charts reached No. 17 in France, and entered several European charts. The album has been nominated for the 2011 Barclaycard Mercury Prize.

History 
The debut album's material had been written in Anna Calvi's parents' attic, using eight-track equipment. Of Rob Ellis, best known for his work with PJ Harvey, she said: 
Calvi herself said she was proud with the album and picked out two songs where she felt she'd got close to what she ultimately wanted to achieve: "Love Won’t Be Leaving" (noted for microscopic sound detailisation) and "The Devil". "I see music very visually. And I want the music itself to express the story as much, if not more, than the lyrics. I think I achieved that on Love Won’t Be Leaving," she commented on the former. As for the latter, "It’s a good example of how I wanted to make the guitar sound like another instrument. I wanted the middle-section to sound like the strings on a Hitchcock soundtrack. It crescendos towards an explosion, but in a real and honest way. It's not about bravado," she added.

Singles 
"Blackout" with the cover of Surrender (classic Neapolitan song, originally Torna a Surriento, adapted for Elvis Presley in 1961 by Doc Pomus and Mort Shuman, with lyrics by Claude Aveling) was released as the first single from the album on 21 March 2011 and was debuted on Pitchfork in the US. "Desire" was the second single (backed with a reworking of Leonard Cohen's "Joan of Arc") and was released on 20 June 2011. The track was available on 7" (RUG412) and via digital download (RUG412D).  "Suzanne & I" (backed with the cover of the Shirelles "Baby It's You") was released as the third single from the album on 12 September 2011.

Reception 

Upon its release, Anna Calvi received generally positive reviews from music critics. Aggregating website AnyDecentMusic? reports a score of 7.6 based on 29 professional reviews.

Reviewer Eamonn Seoige (IHeart AU), called the album "fully-formed and... an instantly engaging body of work", argued that it's "key strength is honest, raw power." Describing Calvi's songs as "poetic, free-flowing, often incorporating multiple styles that frame her distinctive and kaleidoscopic vocal range," he added: "A gifted musician, possessor of a unique voice and writer of inimitable songs, Calvi is already primed for greatness." Matt James of PopMatters described Calvi as "eternally glamorous, but perennially doomed nightclub torch-song singer with a skeleton army in their closet" and her debut, never "afraid to be fantastical, striking," as "rich and strange". NME called the debut "perhaps the first great record of 2011." According to Jon O'Brien of AllMusic, this "ambitious and always intriguing debut... heralds the arrival of a unique and inventive addition to the plethora of U.K. female singer/songwriters."

Mojo placed the album at number 8 on its list of "Top 50 albums of 2011."

Track listing

Personnel 
 Anna Calvi – lead vocals, bass guitar, guitar, organ, piano, production, string arrangements, strings, violin
 Brian Eno – piano, backing vocals (tracks 3, 4)
 Mally Harpaz – drums, harmonium, percussion
 Daniel Maiden-Wood – bass, drums, backing vocals
 Dave Okumu – backing vocals (track 2)

Technical personnel
 Peter Deimel – engineering
 Rob Ellis – production
 David Odlux – assistant
 Chris Potter – mastering
 Jimmy Robertson – engineering
 Craig Silvey – mixing
 Pritpal Soor – mixing, production
 Emma Nathan - artwork

Charts

Sales

!scope="row"|Worldwide
|
|170,000
|-

References 

2011 debut albums
Anna Calvi albums
Domino Recording Company albums
European Border Breakers Award-winning albums